This is the results breakdown of the local elections held in the Balearic Islands on 28 May 1995. The following tables show detailed results in the autonomous community's most populous municipalities, sorted alphabetically.

Overall

City control
The following table lists party control in the most populous municipalities, including provincial capitals (shown in bold). Gains for a party are displayed with the cell's background shaded in that party's colour.

Municipalities

Calvià

Ciutadella de Menorca
Population: 21,026

Ibiza
Population: 34,336

Inca
Population: 21,407

Llucmajor
Population: 19,606

Manacor
Population: 28,653

Maó-Mahón
Population: 23,090

Palma de Mallorca
Population: 322,008

Santa Eulària des Riu
Population: 18,386

See also
1995 Balearic regional election

References

Balearic Islands
1995